A.V.Gokuldas is a production designer (Art Director) in the Indian film industry. He has won the Kerala State Film Award for Best Production Design four times. His work in Kammatipaadam won him international recognition. Over the years, he has emerged to become the celebrated art director in the state.

Early life and education
Gokuldas was born in Kerala and completed his schooling at Ambalapuram school and Aryampadam Sarvodaya higher secondary school. He graduated from the College of Fine Arts, Thrissur.

Career
After finishing his fine arts diploma from the government College of Fine Arts, Thrissur, instead of pursuing his career as an art director, he started assisting famous art directors Sabu Cyril and Sunil Babu for a few more years to gain expertise in his art direction career. After assisting with Sabu, he got a chance to do the art direction for the movie "Sayahnam", directed by R. Sarath, which fetched him his first Kerala State award for Best Art Direction in 2000.

Filmography

Awards
2000 - Kerala State Film Award for Best Art Director - Sayahnam
2006 - Kerala State Film Award for Best Art Director - Thantra
2016 - Kerala State Film Award for Best Art Director- Kammatipaadam
2022 - Kerala State Film Award for Best Art Director- Thuramukham (2022 film)

References

Jallikattu
Catch Rajisha Vijayan-Shine Tom Chacko film ‘Love’ to release in the cinemas on THIS date! - Times of India
‘Churuli’ trailer: A spectacular, intense, surrealistic and tough nut to crack fantasy movie is on its way! - Times of India
Fahadh Faasil to star in Dileesh Pothan-Syam Pushkaran's Macbeth-inspired 'Joji'
Rajisha Vijayan's ‘Love’ becomes the first Indian movie to release in theatres amid the pandemic - Times of India
Rajesh Touchriver announces making of multilingual film on ‘Cyanide’ Mohan
Exclusive! Cinematographer-turned-directors like Amal Neerad and Santhosh Sivan have clarity about everything: Mollywood art director Ajayan Chalissery - Times of India
Lijo Jose Pellissery: Churuli raises existential questions that I want audiences to ponder - Times of India
Priyamani joins the cast of Rajesh Touchriver's Cyanide - Times of India
The trailer of ‘Love’ to arrive on THIS date! - Times of India
Lijo Jose Pellissery decodes the animal spirits
‘Naaradhan,’ starring Tovino and Anna Ben, is a thriller - Times of India

[‘https://timesofindia.indiatimes.com/entertainment/malayalam/movies/news/bro-daddy-its-a-wrap-for-mohanlal-prithviraj-movie/articleshow/86002054.cms]

External links
 
Film on ‘Cyanide’ Mohan Film on ‘Cyanide’ Mohan
Oscars 2021: Lijo Jose Pellissery's 'Jallikattu' Is India's Official Entry To The 93rd Academy Awards Oscars 2021: Lijo Jose Pellissery's 'Jallikattu' Is India's Official Entry To The 93rd Academy Awards
Watch: Makers of ‘Churuli’ drop another trailer with an alternate and ‘interesting’ ending! Watch: Makers of ‘Churuli’ drop another trailer with an alternate and ‘interesting’ ending! - Times of India
‘Pada’ poster shows partially covered faces of 4 heroes 
‘Naaradhan,’ starring Tovino and Anna Ben, is a thriller ‘Naaradhan,’ starring Tovino and Anna Ben, is a thriller - Times of India
Joji Review: Let's Celebrate Fahadh Faasil As He Gives Macbeth Another Hauntingly Beautiful Life! Joji Review: Let’s Celebrate Fahadh Faasil As He Gives Macbeth Another Hauntingly Beautiful Life!
First look of 'Pada' reveals the principal cast First look of 'Pada' reveals the principal cast
Ennu Ninte Moideen Movie Review: An Eternal Love Saga! Ennu Ninte Moideen Movie Review: An Eternal Love Saga!
Kerala State Film Awards 2016: Best Art: Gokuldas and Nagaraj for Kammttippadam Kerala State Film Awards 2016: Vinayakan, Rajisha Vijayan, Vidhu Vincent, Win...

People from Thrissur district
Indian art directors
Malayali people
Living people
Kerala State Film Award winners
1972 births
Indian production designers
20th-century Indian designers
Film people from Kerala
21st-century Indian designers